The rural district of Lutterworth in Leicestershire, England existed from 1894 to 1974. It contained the following civil parishes:

Arnesby
Ashby Magna
Ashby Parva
Bittesby
Bitteswell
Broughton Astley
Bruntingthorpe
Catthorpe
Claybrooke Magna
Claybrooke Parva
Cotesbach
Dunton Bassett
Frolesworth
Gilmorton
Kimcote and Walton
Knaptoft
Leire
Lutterworth
Misterton
North Kilworth
Peatling Magna
Peatling Parva
Shawell
Shearsby
South Kilworth
Swinford
Ullesthorpe
Walton in Knaptoft
Westrill and Starmore
Wigston Parva
Willoughby Waterleys

In 1974 it was merged under the Local Government Act 1972 to form part of the new Harborough non-metropolitan district, along with Market Harborough Rural District and Market Harborough.

External links
Lutterworth RD

History of Leicestershire
Local government in Leicestershire
Districts of England created by the Local Government Act 1894
Districts of England abolished by the Local Government Act 1972
Rural districts of England
Harborough District